Dulce de batata (in , or: sweet potato jam) or doce de batata doce (Portuguese expression with the same meaning) is a traditional  Uruguayan, Argentine, Paraguayan  and Brazilian dessert, which is made of sweet potatoes. It is a sweet jelly, which resembles a marmalade because of its hard texture. In Brazil it is known as marrom glacê.

When sold commercially, it is often found canned in flat and round metal cans. In some of the commercial versions of the food, chocolate is added to it.

It is commonly eaten with crackers and/or cheese.

See also
 List of desserts
 List of sweet potato dishes
 

Uruguayan desserts
Argentine desserts
Paraguayan desserts
Desserts
Sweet potatoes